The Anthony Yoerg Sr. House is a historic house in Saint Paul, Minnesota, United States.  It was the home of Anthony Yoerg (1816–1896), a Bavarian immigrant who constructed Minnesota's first brewery; the house is located high on the  bluffs and the brewery was located just below the house on the lowlands in Saint Paul's West Side neighborhood. It is listed on the National Register of Historic Places.

The house was completed in 1875 by Monroe Sheire, and is one of the few surviving works by Sheire.  One other surviving work is the Alexander Ramsey House, completed in 1872.

References

External links
 NRHP Nomination Form

Houses completed in 1875
Houses in Saint Paul, Minnesota
Houses on the National Register of Historic Places in Minnesota
National Register of Historic Places in Saint Paul, Minnesota
Second Empire architecture in Minnesota